Pyotr Grigoryevich Grigoryev (3 January 1899 – 12 November 1942) was a Soviet football player. He died in Leningrad during the Second World War siege of that city.

Honours
 RSFSR champion: 1924.
 USSR champion: 1931

International career
Grigoryev made his debut for USSR on 16 November 1924 in a friendly against Turkey.

External links
  Profile

1899 births
1942 deaths
Russian footballers
Soviet footballers
Soviet Union international footballers
Soviet Top League players
Association football forwards
Victims of the Siege of Leningrad